Laakdal is a municipality located in the Belgian province of Antwerp. Laakdal was founded in 1977 out of a merger of the towns Veerle, Eindhout and Vorst. In 2021, Laakdal had a total population of 16,293. The total area is 42.48 km².

The municipality has 6 neighbouring towns. Clockwise on the compass these are: Geel, Meerhout, Ham, Tessenderlo, Scherpenheuvel-Zichem and Herselt.

References

External links

Official website 
Official website of Eindhout 

 
Municipalities of Antwerp Province
Populated places in Antwerp Province